Staffordshire University is a public research university in Staffordshire, England. It has one main campus based in the city of Stoke-on-Trent and four other campuses; in Stafford, Lichfield, Shrewsbury and London.

History 
In 1901, industrialist Alfred Bolton acquired a  site on what is now College Road and in 1906 mining classes began there. In 1907, pottery classes followed, being transferred from Tunstall into temporary buildings, and in 1914 the building now known as the Cadman Building was officially opened as the Central School of Science and Technology by J. A. Pease, President of the Board of Education. A frieze over the entrance depicts potters and miners. In 2013, the Library Conference room in the Cadman Building was renamed the Alfred Bolton Room.

In 1915, a department was established for the commercial production of Seger cones used to measure and control the temperatures of ceramic furnaces, based upon research completed by the principal, Joseph Mellor. Grants from the Carnegie United Kingdom Trust in 1924 were used to develop the ceramics library and in 1926 the name of the institution was changed to North Staffordshire Technical College. By 1931 extensions to the Cadman Building ran along Station Road and housed the Mining Department. A grant was awarded from the Miners’ Welfare Fund to fund the building work. The new extension also housed the library, which by now had 35,000 volumes. By 1934 the college consisted of four departments: Engineering (nearly 800 students), Pottery (just over 600 students), Mining (just under 500 students), and Chemistry (under 300 students).

In 1939, new engineering workshops were occupied for the first time and the land opposite the Cadman Building was purchased. The Mellor Building and Experimental Production Block (now Dwight Building) were constructed for the North Staffordshire College of Technology by 1960.

Various faculty movements and further building work resulted in North Staffordshire Polytechnic being formed in 1970 with the merger of Stoke-on-Trent College of Art, North Staffordshire College of Technology (both based in Stoke-on-Trent), and Staffordshire College of Technology in Stafford. In 1977, the polytechnic absorbed Madeley College of Education, formerly County of Stafford Training College, a teacher training facility in Madeley, Staffordshire specialising in physical education.

The polytechnic developed traditional strengths of the component institutions, e.g. ceramics (Stoke-on-Trent), computing (Stafford) and sports education (Madeley). The mining department closed as result of the decline of coal mining in the 1980s. New subjects were developed. North Staffordshire Polytechnic was among only a handful of third-level institutions in the UK to offer International Relations as a dedicated degree. The 1992 UK government Research Assessment Exercise placed the International Relations Department as the highest-rated in the institution.

In 1988, the institution changed its name to Staffordshire Polytechnic. In 1992, it became Staffordshire University, one of the new universities based on former polytechnics.

Campuses 

The university has one main campuses, and four other campuses in Stafford, London, Lichfield and Shrewsbury,and extensive links with National, European and transnational academic institutions.

Stoke-on-Trent
The main campus is in Shelton, Stoke-on-Trent, and primarily offers law, business, sciences, applied computing, engineering, arts, design, games, journalism and media production courses. These are split into two areas, one on College Road (on the site of the former County Cricket Ground), and the other on Leek Road. A Science Centre was opened in 2012 as part of a major redevelopment adjacent to Stoke-on-Trent railway station. In 2022, the University opened a new £42 million building on the Leek Road site - The Catalyst. This 8,800 sqm, four storey building, brought together the delivery of apprenticeships and skills, to meet employer demand, in flexible, high-quality, digitally enabled space.

The Stoke campus also features its own student nightclub called LRV (Leek Road Venue). This nightclub hosts a variety of student nights on various days of the week but its main open nights are on a Wednesday and Friday.

A public film theatre is situated on the side of the Flaxman building on College Road, which shows mainstream and independent films on a regular basis to an audience of up to 180 people, as well as being used for large lectures. In 2006, a TV studio facility was opened by former BBC Director General Greg Dyke in the Arts, Media and Design faculty building on College Road, Stoke. The £1 million development features up-to-date technology and industry specification equipment.

The Stoke-on-Trent campus is also home to the Sir Stanley Matthews Sports Centre. Named after Stoke City player and football legend, Sir Stanley Matthews CBE, the sports centre is located on Leek Road campus and is open to students, staff and the public.

Staffordshire University London: Digital Institute 
Located at Here East in East London, the Digital Institute opened in 2019 and is a state-of-the-art facility focused on new and emerging technology, primarily based around Games and Computing courses, key specialisms of the University since the 1960s. It houses studio-style learning environments  with a fully-equipped control room and other high-tech facilities including a dedicated esports arena. In 2021, the university invested £3.5m to increase its footprint to 31,133 sq feet, and allow the provider to expand the range of courses it has on offer for 2022.

Stafford and Shrewsbury 
Nursing, midwifery, operating department practice and paramedic science courses are taught at the "Centre of Excellence" in Stafford on Blackheath Lane and at the "Centre for Health Innovation" in Shrewsbury which is situated at the Royal Shrewsbury Hospital.

In March 2022, the university opened the £5.8 million state-of-the-art Centre for Health Innovation. Featuring the most advanced health simulation technology, the Centre offers a series of flexible and immersive simulation spaces designed to enhance clinical competency and the learning experience for students.

The new Centre was part-funded by Stoke-on-Trent & Staffordshire Local Enterprise Partnership (LEP) via the Government’s Getting Building Fund. The LEP allocated £2.89m to the scheme to help bring forward the pioneering facility and generate further opportunity for learners and businesses in the area.

The facility was officially opened by Professor Mark Radford CBE, Chief Nurse for Health Education England and Deputy Chief Nursing Officer for England and honorary Doctor of Staffordshire University.

As well as being the study base for more than 2,000 student nurses, midwives, operating department practitioners and paramedics, the Centre also offers a platform for new collaborations with local business and healthcare and technology industries.

Lichfield

In 1998, in partnership with Tamworth and Lichfield College, the university opened a newly built campus in Lichfield.

Shrewsbury, Telford, and Oswestry
This part of the university is mainly for nursing and midwifery courses, and is still part of the university despite all three settlements being located in the neighbouring county of Shropshire.

Overseas
The university has many overseas students studying for Staffordshire University awards in Belgium, China, Vietnam, France, Greece, India, Kosovo, Malaysia, Nigeria, Singapore, Spain, and Sri Lanka. The university also conducts a twinning programme with DISTED College in George Town, Penang, Malaysia.

Staffordshire University offers programmes in Hung Yen, Ecopark Township, Vietnam through the British University Vietnam. The university has a strong partnership with the Vrije Universiteit Brussel, Belgium.

Halls of residence
The university offers guaranteed accommodation for all first-year students, provided the university is their firm UCAS choice. All accommodation is situated close to all teaching, sporting, and Union venues.

Stafford
The Stafford campus has its own halls of residence, Stafford Court, comprising over 264 en-suite single study bedrooms and 290 single study bedrooms with shared facilities. The various houses take their names from villages in Staffordshire: Brocton, Derrington, Eccleshall, Gnosall, Haughton, Knightley, Levedale, Milwich, Norbury, Ranton, Shugborough and Weston.

A separate block of larger flats, named after the village of Yarlet (previously Beckett Hall), is also on the same site. This comprises an additional 51 single-study bedrooms over three floors, each accommodating 17 residents, who share a kitchen, dining room and four shower rooms. All of these halls are directly opposite the Stafford campus buildings on Weston Road.

By September 2016 only the midwifery, nursing, paramedic science, operation department practitioners and other allied and public health courses will remain at the Blackheath Lane site (Stafford) with the rest moved to Stoke.

Stoke
At Stoke, halls of residence are primarily situated on the Leek Road campus. The shared-bathroom accommodation was sponsored by various local potteries, and halls are therefore named after them, for example Royal Doulton, Coalport, Mintons, Spode, Aynsley and Wedgwood halls.

The on-campus en-suite accommodation is contained within Clarice Cliff Court, comprising seven halls, each of about 30 students over three floors, each hall named after female ceramicists: Rachel Bishop, Eve Midwinter, Jessie van Hallen, Charlotte Rhead, Jessie Tait, Millicent Taplin and Star Wedgwood. Along with the halls and en-suite, the university also offers 32 houses, known as the Leek Road Houses, each of which accommodates up to 6 people each.

Carlton House, Etruscan House, Caledonia Road, Queen Anne Street Flats, Cromwell Court, Church Street and Sovereign House are situated off campus. They are all within  of the Stoke Campus, and are reserved for postgraduate and returning (second and third year) students.

The Shelton area of Stoke is where many students choose to live after their first year. The proximity of Shelton to the university and the large quantity of student accommodation has effectively turned it into a mini-student village. Alternatively, there are also the College Court Halls, which are privately run but operate in a similar way to university-run halls. They are situated opposite Hanley Park and are close to the university.

Organisation 
The university restructured in 2021 and has now three academic schools, alongside the Institute of Education and Staffordshire University London.

 School of Digital, Technology and Arts
 School of Health, Science and Wellbeing
 School of Justice, Security and Sustainability
 Institute of Education
 Staffordshire University London

Staffordshire University Services

As of 1st April 2021, all new academic and professional services staff are employed by Staffordshire University Services - which the University describes as 'a wholly owned subsidiary company of Staffordshire University'. Staff employed by Staffordshire University Services have no access to the defined benefit Teachers' Pension Scheme and instead join a new defined contribution scheme that does guarantee a set level of income in retirement.

The University and College Union claimed that this would create a "two tier workforce"..

In March 2022, Almost three-quarters (70 per cent) of staff backed strike action over the matter.

Academic profile 

The School of Computing was originally situated at Blackheath Lane on the edge of Stafford in GEC's former Nelson Research Laboratory. It offered one of the first BSc courses in computing in the United Kingdom and its first major computer was a second hand DEUCE. The School of Computing later moved to a purpose-built building on the Beaconside campus, the Octagon, constructed in 1992 when university status had been achieved. 

The university was the first institution to introduce a single honours degree in Film, Television and Radio Studies in 1990. A new Media Centre was opened by Greg Dyke in 2005, comprising radio studios, television news desk and broadcast journalist suite. Courses in print, broadcast and sports journalism are nationally accredited by the National Council for the Training of Journalists and the Broadcast Journalism Training Council.

The Forensic Science degrees (Forensic Science, Forensic Science and Criminology and Forensic Science and Psychology) were accredited by the Forensic Science Society (FSC) in 2007, one of four universities whose courses have been acknowledged for teaching services and high academic quality.  The Forensic theme is continued with a specialist Forensic Biology degree and on the Stafford Campus the Faculty of Computing Engineering and Technology was one of the first university faculties in the UK to offer undergraduate and postgraduate degrees in the new field of Forensic Computing.

League table rankings

The university's world ranking is 1,354 in 2010, according to webometrics.info.

Student life

Students' Union 
Staffordshire University Students' Union aims to represent students at the university. Constitutionally it is governed by the student body, who annually elect a student council which is responsible for the organisation of the Union. The day-to-day operation of the union is handled by four Sabbatical Officers and four student trustees, who are held to account by the Council. All officer positions, bar the four sabbatical officers, work on a part-time basis.

The union is active enough and dedicated for the students’ welfare from the freshers’ week to Alumni night. Stoke-on-Trent, the main campus is surrounded by industrial heritage and creative artistic flair.

Sports 
Since 2007, Staffordshire University (Stoke Campus) and Keele University have engaged in an annual varsity match. In 2013 Staffordshire University (Stafford Campus) and Wolverhampton University engaged in an annual varsity match. In 2021, the university tied up with Indian Super League club Odisha FC under the later's Education and Community partnership Program

Notable alumni

Academia and Science
David Bolt, Academic specialising in literature and disability
Paul Reilly, Computer scientist
Zhengxu Zhao, Scientist of space mission visualisation and control.

Arts and Media
Peter Bebb, special effect artist
Ian Clark, film director and screenwriter
Jim Davies, Guitarist for The Prodigy and Pitchshifter
Marcus Dillistone, Film Director and music producer
Dale Vince, green energy pioneer and boss of Ecotricity
John Robb, journalist and musician 
Alex Frost, artist
Raimi Gbadamosi, Conceptual artist
Dave Gorman, English author, comedian, and television presenter
Michael Greco, Soap actor
Paul Harvey, Stuckist artist
Emma Jones, Tabloid journalist
Edward Lay, Drummer for rock band Editors
David Leach, Studio potter
Russell Leetch, Bass guitarist for rock band Editors
Ian McMillan, Poet
Tom Smith, Lead singer for rock band Editors
Chris Urbanowicz, Lead Guitarist for rock band Editors

Politics and Service
Shafie Apdal, Chief Minister of Sabah (Malaysian Constitution)
Avdullah Hoti, Prime Minister of Kosovo
Fatmir Besimi, Minister of the Economy of the Republic of Macedonia
Michelle Brown, UKIP Member of the National Assembly for Wales
Jane Kambalame, Malawi High Commissioner to Zimbabwe and Botswana
Tim Field, Founder of the UK National Workplace Bullying Advice Line
Mike O'Brien, Former Labour MP and Minister of State for Health Services
Jared O'Mara, Former Labour MP for Sheffield Hallam
David Kwaku Ziga, Ghanaian potter and politician

Sports
Jermaine Allen, American football running back
Matt Baker, Professional footballer
Chris Beardsley, Professional footballer
James Beaumont, Professional footballer
George Berry, Professional footballer and Welsh international
Kate Dennison, Pole vaulter and current British record holder
Josh Gordon, Professional footballer
John Mayock, Athlete and olympian
Scott Minto, Professional footballer and sports broadcaster
Fabrice Muamba, Professional footballer 
Graham Shaw, Professional football
Sam Stockley, Professional footballer
Gavin Strachan, Professional footballer
Andrew Triggs Hodge, Olympic gold medallist and World Champion rower
Mark Wallace, Cricketer

Arts alumni
Many famous artists produced by the former art schools of Stoke-on-Trent can be regarded as alumni, as the university is the successor institution.

Burslem School of Art
William Bowyer, Artist
Clarice Cliff, Ceramic artist
Susie Cooper, Ceramic artist
Jessie Tait, Ceramic artist
Sidney Tushingham, Artist and etcher
Fenton School of Art
Charlotte Rhead, Ceramic artist
Stoke School of Art
Arnold Machin, Coin and stamp designer

See also
 Armorial of UK universities
 List of universities in the UK
 Post-1992 universities

References

External links 
 Staffordshire University website
 

 
Educational institutions established in 1971
1971 establishments in England
Universities UK